The 2009–10 DFB-Pokal season came to a close on 15 May 2010 when Bayern Munich played defending champions Werder Bremen at the Olympiastadion in Berlin.  Bayern thrashed Bremen 4-0 with goals from Robben, Olić, Ribéry, and Schweinsteiger.  The title capped off a successful season, with Bayern winning the domestic double of the Fußball-Bundesliga and the DFB-Pokal. These successes were Bayern's 22nd league and 15th cup titles. Bayern were also in line for The Treble but lost to Internazionale of Milan, 2-0 in the Champions League Final at Madrid's Santiago Bernabéu Stadium on 22 May.

Route to the final
The DFB-Pokal began with 64 teams in a single-elimination knockout cup competition. There were a total of five rounds leading up to the final. Teams were drawn against each other, and the winner after 90 minutes would advance. If still tied, 30 minutes of extra time was played. If the score was still level, a penalty shoot-out was used to determine the winner.

Note: In all results below, the score of the finalist is given first (H: home; A: away).

Match

Details

References

External links
 Match report at kicker.de 
 Match report at WorldFootball.net
 Match report at Fussballdaten.de 

2010
2009–10 in German football cups
SV Werder Bremen matches
FC Bayern Munich matches
Football competitions in Berlin
2010 in Berlin
May 2010 sports events in Europe